Signed to the Streets is a mixtape by American hip hop recording artist Lil Durk, hosted by DJ Drama. It was released on October 10, 2013. The mixtape features production by Chase Davis, Dree The Drummer, Fade, Nito Beats, Paris Beuller, Sunny Norway, TGM, Young Chop and Zaytoven.

Recording and reception
Lil Durk summarized the mixtape in an interview with MTV: "It's a lot more interesting. There's a lot more storytelling. It's different from my last mixtape but it’s still real rapping. I just stepped it up a notch. I got DJ Drama and he made it bigger."
 
Rolling Stone ranked Signed to the Streets eighth on its list of the top 10 mixtapes of 2013. Stereogum's Tom Breihan wrote that the mixtape "has the tough-minded energy that made so much of that drill stuff exciting in the first place, and it also has other things working for it: Hooks, songcraft, emotional force, a sound of its own." Renato Pagnani of Pitchfork Media called it Lil Durk's "best mixtape yet. He continues to straddle the blurry line between singing and rapping, and his songwriting has grown tighter and more evocative with time. Before, his use of Auto-Tune felt a bit gratuitous, but now it's woven into his style more organically."

Track listing

References

External links
Signed to the Streets at DatPiff

2013 mixtape albums
Albums produced by Young Chop
Albums produced by Zaytoven
Lil Durk albums